Pavetta axillipara is a species of plant in the family Rubiaceae. It is endemic to Tanzania.

References

Flora of Tanzania
axillipara
Vulnerable plants
Endemic flora of Tanzania
Taxonomy articles created by Polbot